Gănești is a commune in Mureș County, Transylvania, Romania. It is composed of four villages: Gănești, Păucișoara (Küküllőpócsfalva), Seuca (Szőkefalva) and Sub Pădure (Erdőalja). It also included Cuștelnic village until 2002, when it was transferred to Târnăveni city.

It lies on both banks of the river Târnava Mică and it is traversed by the river Băgaciu (or Bedea).

Gănești borders the communes Cucerdea and Ogra to the north, Mica to the east, Băgaciu to the south, and the city of Târnăveni to the west.

As of January 1, 2012, the commune had a population of 3,511, of which 2,300 were ethnic Hungarians (65.5%), 862 ethnic Romanians (24.5%), and 346 ethnic Romanis (9.9%).

See also
List of Hungarian exonyms (Mureș County)

References

Communes in Mureș County
Localities in Transylvania